Christian Montes (born 12 January 1942) is a French former professional football player and manager. In his playing days as a goalkeeper, he played for Bordeaux, Cherbourg, Strasbourg, and Monaco. Following his retirement in 1976, he became the head coach of his former club Bordeaux for two seasons.

Honours 
Bordeaux

 Coupe de France runner-up: 1967–68, 1968–69
 Coupe Charles Drago runner-up: 1965

Strasbourg

 Division 2: 1971–72

Monaco

 Coupe de France runner-up: 1973–74

Notes

References 

1942 births
Living people
Sportspeople from Gironde
French footballers
Association football goalkeepers
FC Girondins de Bordeaux players
AS Cherbourg Football players
RC Strasbourg Alsace players
AS Monaco FC players
Ligue 2 players
Ligue 1 players
French football managers
FC Girondins de Bordeaux managers
Ligue 1 managers
Footballers from Nouvelle-Aquitaine